The Durnholzer Tal is a tributary valley of the Sarntal in South Tyrol, Italy. The villages in the valley are Durnholz and Reinswald, which are frazioni of the municipality of Sarntal.

References 
Alpenverein South Tyrol 

Valleys of South Tyrol